Tomás Leandro Marini (February 27, 1902 – December 2, 1984) was an Argentine ichthyologist.

Work 
Argentine hake (Merluccius hubbsi), 1933

External links
 John Simon Guggenheim Foundation | Tomás Leandro Marini

1902 births
1984 deaths
Ichthyologists
University of Buenos Aires alumni
Academic staff of the University of Buenos Aires
20th-century Argentine zoologists